Diego Ivan Chavarri Rodriguez (born March 7, 1989 in New York City) is a Peruvian-American soccer player who plays as offensive midfielder and winger for San Simón in the Segunda Division Peruana.

Profile
Diego Chávarri started his playing career at Sporting Cristal's youth divisions. In 2009, he was promoted to Sporting Cristal's first team.
 He joined Cobresol for the first part of 2012 then joinedSport Huancayo for the latter part of 2012. In early 2013, he signed with Unión Comercio. He joined newly promoted Iran Pro League side Gostaresh Foolad on July 4, 2013.

International
In 2011, he was invited to participate in a United States men's national under-23 soccer team camp but was unable to attend due to injury. Chávarri has announced that he would like to play for the U.S national team.

References

1989 births
Living people
Sportspeople from Queens, New York
Soccer players from New York City
Association football midfielders
Citizens of Peru through descent
Peruvian footballers
American sportspeople of Peruvian descent
Sporting Cristal footballers
Cobresol FBC footballers
Sport Huancayo footballers
Unión Comercio footballers
Gostaresh Foulad F.C. players
Expatriate footballers in Peru
Expatriate footballers in Iran